The following is a list of converts to Hinduism from other religions or a non-religious background.

From Abrahamic religions

Christianity 

 Nayanthara
 Julia Roberts
 Sati Kazanova
Russell Brand

Islam 

Anirudh Gyan Shikha (1 June 1928 – 25 November 2006; popularly known as Anwar Shaikh
Jitendra Narayan Singh Tyagi (born Waseem Rizvi) former member and chairman of the Shia Central Waqf Board.

Judaism
Ram Dass (born Richard Alpert) (1931-2019) – syncretist, and follower of the Hindu deity Hanuman. Professor of psychology at Harvard University.
 Tamal Krishna Goswami (born Thomas G. Herzig) (1946-2002) – governing body commissioner of the International Society for Krishna Consciousness.
Lora Logic (b. 1960) – punk rock saxophonist with Poly Styrene's X-Ray Spex. 
 Radhanath Swami (born Richard Slavin) (b. 1950) – very prominent Bhakti yoga guru and a governing body commissioner of the International Society for Krishna Consciousness.

From other Indian-origin religions

This is list of converts from Indian-origin religions. All Indian religions, Hinduism, Buddhism, Jainsim and Sikhism, are collective called "Sanatan Dharma" and "Dhamma", and all others are called mleccha. All Indian religions usually practice mutual religious syncretism among each other.

Buddhism

 Mihirakula  – Huna ruler. 
Rajasinghe I – Sri Lankan king who conquered Kandy.
 Rishabhadatta – Satrap viceroy.
 Rudradaman I  – Satrap ruler and conqueror of the Satavahanas.
 Vasudeva I – Kushan king 
 Jayavarman III

Jainism

Mahendravarman I – Pallava King and patron of the arts.
Vishnuvardhana – King of Hoysala empire and prominent temple-builder.
Tirunavukkarasar – Saivite saint and one of the most prominent of the sixty-three Nayanars.

Other

Other theist converts 
 Mihirakula (r. c. 502-530) – Huna ruler. 
Heliodorus – Greek minister to King Bhagabhadra.
Pamheiba (1690–1751) – Manipuri King
Suhungmung – Ahom kingdom's ruler who extended Assam up to the Kamarupa Kingdom
Supangmung – Ahom kingdom's ruler who recaptured Guwahati. Converted to Vaishnavism.
 Susenghphaa – Ahom king; during his rule the Ahom-Mughal conflicts began

Non-theistic converts 

 Annie Besant – British socialist, theosophist, women's rights activist, writer, orator, and supporter of both Irish and Indian self-rule.
 John Dobson (former atheist who became a believer in Vedanta) – astronomer and telescope designer.
 Sita Ram Goel (former atheist) – Indian commentator, writer and Hindu activist.
Chrissie Hynde (born September 7, 1951) is an American musician. She is a founding member and the lead vocalist, guitarist, and primary songwriter of the garage rock new wave band the Pretenders.
Poly Styrene (3 July 1957 – 25 April 2011), singer with one of Britain's earliest punk rock bands, X-Ray Spex; earlier religious affiliation unknown (Poly Styrene had one Sudanese parent, possibly Muslim, and one British parent of unknown religion) .

Converts from undetermined former religion

 Agehananda Bharati (born Leopold Fischer) (1923-1991) – academic Sanskritist, a prolific author about religious subjects, and a Hindu monk in the Dasanami Sannyasi order.
 Alain Daniélou – French historian, intellectual, musicologist, and Indologist.
 Crispian Mills of Kula Shaker – Hare Krishna devotee. His initiated name is Krishna Kantha Dasa. He was initiated by Narayana Maharaja. He wrote a foreword to a book by Bhaktivinoda Thakur titled Sri Siksastaka.
 Geoffrey Giuliano – American biographer.

 Nina Hagen (follower of Haidakhan Babaji) – German singer.
 Joe Don Looney (follower of Swami Muktananda) – football player.
 J Mascis – lead vocalist, guitarist, and drummer for Dinosaur Jr.
 John McLaughlin (became a disciple of Sri Chinmoy) – jazz fusion guitar player.
 Lex Hixon (syncretist and disciple of Swami Nikhilananda) – poet, philosopher, spiritual practitioner and teacher.
 Sati Kazanova, Russian singer.
 Savitri Devi (born Maximiani Portas) – Greek-French writer and Nazi-sympathiser.
 Savitri Khanolkar (born Eve Yvonne Maday de Maros) – designer of India'''s highest gallantry award, the Param Vir Chakra.Mathias Rust – German daredevil pilot.
 Kelli Williams – American actress who played Lindsay Dole Donnell on the ABC legal drama The Practice''.
 Sherlyn Chopra - Indian actress.

See also

 Category:Converts to Hinduism
 List of converts to Hinduism from Islam
 List of converts to Hinduism from Christianity
 List of converts to Hinduism from Buddhism
 List of former Hindus
 List of converts to Islam from Hinduism
 List of converts to Christianity from Hinduism
 List of converts to Sikhism from Hinduism
 List of converts to Buddhism from Hinduism

References 

Hindu law
Converts
Hindu
Hinduism-related lists